Carolina Allier (born 1941) is a Mexican former badminton player that competed nationally and internationally during the 1960s in the women's singles, women's doubles and mixed doubles events. Her brother is Guillermo Allier who is a former badminton player too.

During the 1960s, she ranked among the best Mexican badminton singles players and, together with Antonio Rangel, they became the most successful Mexican mixed doubles team of such decade. Nonetheless, Carolina Allier was also an outstanding badminton player in the women's doubles event.

In 1958, Carolina Allier won for the first time a title in the Mexican National Championship of Badminton. She won 21 more titles in such competition in its three different categories.

In addition, between 1964 and 1968, Carolina Allier won 5 more titles in the Mexican National Open of Badminton.

Besides, Carolina Allier also competed internationally and won some badminton tournaments in different parts of the World.

A very complete and versatile badminton player, Carolina Allier was capable of winning championships playing women's singles as well as teaming up with different badminton partners during her long badminton career.

Sporting career

Mexican National Championships

Mexican National Open Championships

Other competitions 
 1964 - Teaming up with Antonio Rangel, they won the mixed doubles event of the IV University of Texas Open defeating George and Lana Harman of Ponca City, OK.

References 

Mexican female badminton players
Living people
1941 births